The 1975 Notre Dame Fighting Irish football team represented the University of Notre Dame during the 1975 NCAA Division I football season.  It was Dan Devine's first year as head coach, taking over for the retired Ara Parseghian.

Schedule

Personnel

Roster

Coaching staff
Head Coach: Dan Devine
Assistants: Greg Blache (JV), Brian Boulac (OL), Ed Chlebek (ST), Merv Johnson (OC), George Kelly (LB), Hank Kuhlmann (OB/ST), Johnny Roland (Receivers), Paul Shoults (DB), Ross Stephenson (Scouting/Volunteer Ast), Joe Yonto (DL)

Game summaries

Boston College

Purdue

North Carolina

Georgia Tech

This was the famous game in which Rudy Ruettiger, a 5'6", 165-lb, walk-on, was inserted late in the game and recorded a quarterback sack.  His story was in the inspiration for the movie Rudy.

References

Notre Dame
Notre Dame Fighting Irish football seasons
Notre Dame Fighting Irish football